The 1951 Bristol West by-election was held on 15 February 1951.  It was caused by the death of the prominent Conservative ex-Minister Oliver Stanley.  It was easily retained by the Conservative candidate Walter Monckton, who received more than 80% of the votes cast.

References

1951 elections in the United Kingdom
1951 in England
West
1950s in Bristol